Reena is a given name and a variant of Rena

Notable people with the given name include:

Reena (actress), Indian film actress in Malayalam films
Reena Bhardwaj, British Indian singer, songwriter and recording artist
Reena Kaushal Dharmshaktu, first Indian woman to ski to the South Pole
Reena Saini Kallat, Indian artist
Reena Kumari, Indian athlete
Reena Ninan, ABC News correspondent
Reena Raggi, US Federal Judge
Reena Roy, Hindi film actress